Year 1352 (MCCCLII) was a leap year starting on Sunday (link will display the full calendar) of the Julian calendar.

Events 
 January–December 
 June 4 – Glarus joins the Old Swiss Confederacy.
 June 27 – Zug joins the Old Swiss Confederacy.
 September 25 – Emperor Go-Kōgon becomes 4th Emperor of the Northern Court of Japan.
 October – Byzantine civil war of 1352–1357: Battle of Demotika – Fighting as allies of John VI Kantakouzenos, the Ottoman beylik scores its first victory on European soil, against the Serbs.
 November 7 – Corpus Christi College is founded as a College of the University of Cambridge in England, by the Guilds of Corpus Christi and the Blessed Virgin Mary.
 December 18 – Pope Innocent VI succeeds Pope Clement VI as the 199th pope.
 December 26 – The Earldom of Kent of the 5th creation in England becomes extinct.

 Date unknown 
 Süleyman Pasha (son of Orhan) is probably granted control of Çimpe Castle on the Gallipoli peninsula by Emperor John VI Kantakouzenos, the first territory west of the Bosporus held by the Ottoman Empire.
 The Bengal Sultanate is formed after the realms of Satgaon, Lakhnauti and Sonargaon are united under Shamsuddin Ilyas Shah.
 Coming from Hungary, the noble Vlach Dragoş becomes the first voivode of Moldova, being seen as the founder of this principality (some scholars place this moment as early as 1345).
 Following the death of his father Basarab, Nicholas Alexander becomes voivode of Wallachia, after being co-ruler for about eight years.
 The town of Biel/Bienne, Switzerland, finalizes its alliance with the city of Bern.
 Lionel of Antwerp marries Elizabeth, daughter of William de Burgh, 3rd Earl of Ulster.
 Reginald de Cobham, 1st Baron Cobham becomes a Companion of the Most Noble Order of the Garter of England.
 The Metropolitan of the Ukrainian Greek Catholic Church; the Metropolitan of Halych begins to relocate back to Kyiv, after having moved to Halych in 1299. Thereafter, the Metropolitan will hold the title of Metropolitan of Kiev-Halych and All Rus.
 After years of begging and being a Buddhist monk, the penniless Chinese peasant Zhu Yuanzhang joins the Red Turban Rebellions against the Mongol-led Yuan dynasty of China; he will later become the first emperor of the Ming dynasty.
 Earliest surviving illustration of someone wearing spectacles, a fresco in the chapter house of the Dominican convent of San Nicolò, Treviso by Tommaso da Modena (anachronistically) depicting Hugh of Saint-Cher.
 Moroccan traveller Ibn Battuta reports the existence of the ngoni and balafon musical instruments, at the court of Mansa Musa.

Births 
 May 5 – Rupert of Germany, Count Palatine of the Rhine (d. 1410)
 Elizabeth of Slavonia, Latin empress consort of Constantinople
 date unknown
 John Holland, 1st Duke of Exeter (d. 1400)
 Vytautas the Great, Grand Duke of Lithuania (d. 1430)

Deaths 
 September 15 – Ewostatewos, Ethiopian monk and religious leader (b. 1273)
 December 6 – Pope Clement VI (b. 1291)
 date unknown
 Matthias of Arras, French architect (b. 1290)
 Elizabeth of Carinthia, Queen of Sicily, regent of Sicily (b. 1298)
 William de Ros, 3rd Baron de Ros (b. 1325)
 Basarab I of Wallachia
 Al-Hakim II, Caliph of Cairo
 Laurence Minot, English poet (b. 1300)
 Vasilii Kalika, Archbishop of Novgorod
 Yoshida Kenkō, Japanese monk and author (b. 1283)

References